

Events

Pre-1600
 639 – Ashina Jiesheshuai and his tribesmen assaulted Emperor Taizong at Jiucheng Palace.
 715 – Pope Gregory II is elected.
1051 – Henry I of France marries the Rus' princess, Anne of Kiev.
1445 – John II of Castile defeats the Infantes of Aragon at the First Battle of Olmedo.
1499 – Catherine of Aragon is married by proxy to Arthur, Prince of Wales. Catherine is 13 and Arthur is 12.
1535 – French explorer Jacques Cartier sets sail on his second voyage to North America with three ships, 110 men, and Chief Donnacona's two sons (whom Cartier had kidnapped during his first voyage).
1536 – Anne Boleyn, the second wife of Henry VIII of England, is beheaded for adultery, treason, and incest.
1542 – The Prome Kingdom falls to the Taungoo Dynasty in present-day Myanmar.

1601–1900
1643 – Thirty Years' War: French forces under the duc d'Enghien decisively defeat Spanish forces at the Battle of Rocroi, marking the symbolic end of Spain as a dominant land power.
1649 – An Act of Parliament declaring England a Commonwealth is passed by the Long Parliament. England would be a republic for the next eleven years.
1655 – The Invasion of Jamaica begins during the Anglo-Spanish War.
1743 – Jean-Pierre Christin developed the centigrade temperature scale.
1749 – King George II of Great Britain grants the Ohio Company a charter of land around the forks of the Ohio River.
1776 – American Revolutionary War: A Continental Army garrison surrenders in the Battle of The Cedars.
1780 – New England's Dark Day, an unusual darkening of the day sky, was observed over the New England states and parts of Canada. 
1802 – Napoleon Bonaparte founds the Legion of Honour.
1828 – U.S. President John Quincy Adams signs the Tariff of 1828 into law, protecting wool manufacturers in the United States.
1845 – Captain Sir John Franklin and his ill-fated Arctic expedition depart from Greenhithe, England.
1848 – Mexican–American War: Mexico ratifies the Treaty of Guadalupe Hidalgo thus ending the war and ceding California, Nevada, Utah and parts of four other modern-day U.S. states to the United States for US$15 million.
1883 – Buffalo Bill's 1st Buffalo Bill's Wild West opens in Omaha, Nebraska.
1900 – Great Britain annexes Tonga Island.
1900 – Second Boer War: British troops relieve Mafeking.

1901–present
1911 – Parks Canada, the world's first national park service, is established as the Dominion Parks Branch under the Department of the Interior.
1917 – The Norwegian football club Rosenborg BK is founded.
1919 – Mustafa Kemal Atatürk lands at Samsun on the Anatolian Black Sea coast, initiating what is later termed the Turkish War of Independence.
1921 – The United States Congress passes the Emergency Quota Act establishing national quotas on immigration.
1922 – The Young Pioneer Organization of the Soviet Union is established.
1933 – Finnish cavalry general C. G. E. Mannerheim was appointed the field marshal.
1934 – Zveno and the Bulgarian Army engineer a coup d'état and install Kimon Georgiev as the new Prime Minister of Bulgaria.
1942 – World War II: In the aftermath of the Battle of the Coral Sea, Task Force 16 heads to Pearl Harbor.
1945 – Syrian demonstrators in Damascus are fired upon by French troops injuring twelve, leading to the Levant Crisis.
1950 – A barge containing munitions destined for Pakistan explodes in the harbor at South Amboy, New Jersey, devastating the city.
  1950   – Egypt announces that the Suez Canal is closed to Israeli ships and commerce.
1959 – The North Vietnamese Army establishes Group 559, whose responsibility is to determine how to maintain supply lines to South Vietnam; the resulting route is the Ho Chi Minh trail.
1961 – Venera program: Venera 1 becomes the first man-made object to fly by another planet by passing Venus (the probe had lost contact with Earth a month earlier and did not send back any data).
  1961   – At Silchar Railway Station, Assam, 11 Bengalis die when police open fire on protesters demanding state recognition of Bengali language in the Bengali Language Movement.
1962 – A birthday salute to U.S. President John F. Kennedy takes place at Madison Square Garden, New York City. The highlight is Marilyn Monroe's rendition of "Happy Birthday".
1963 – The New York Post Sunday Magazine publishes Martin Luther King Jr.'s Letter from Birmingham Jail.
1971 – Mars probe program: Mars 2 is launched by the Soviet Union.
1986 – The Firearm Owners Protection Act is signed into law by U.S. President Ronald Reagan.
1991 – Croatians vote for independence in a referendum.
1993 – SAM Colombia Flight 501 crashes on approach to José María Córdova International Airport in Medellín, Colombia, killing 132.
1996 – Space Shuttle program: Space Shuttle Endeavour is launched on mission STS-77.
1997 – The Sierra Gorda biosphere, the most ecologically diverse region in Mexico, is established as a result of grassroots efforts.
2000 – Space Shuttle program: Space Shuttle Atlantis is launched on mission STS-101 to resupply the International Space Station.
2007 – President of Romania Traian Băsescu survives an impeachment referendum and returns to office from suspension.
2010 – The Royal Thai Armed Forces concludes its crackdown on protests by forcing the surrender of United Front for Democracy Against Dictatorship leaders.
2012 – Three gas cylinder bombs explode in front of a vocational school in the Italian city of Brindisi, killing one person and injuring five others.
  2012   – A car bomb explodes near a military complex in the Syrian city of Deir ez-Zor, killing nine people.
2015 – The Refugio oil spill deposited 142,800 U.S. gallons (3,400 barrels) of crude oil onto an area in California considered one of the most biologically diverse coastlines of the west coast.
2016 – EgyptAir Flight 804 crashes into the Mediterranean Sea while traveling from Paris to Cairo, killing all on board.
2018 – The wedding of Prince Harry and Meghan Markle is held at St George's Chapel, Windsor, with an estimated global audience of 1.9 billion.

Births

Pre-1600
1400 – John Stourton, 1st Baron Stourton, English soldier and politician (d. 1462)
1462 – Baccio D'Agnolo, Italian woodcarver, sculptor and architect (d. 1543)
1476 (or 1474) – Helena of Moscow, Grand Duchess consort of Lithuania and Queen consort of Poland (d. 1513)
1593 – Claude Vignon, French painter (d. 1670)

1601–1900
1616 – Johann Jakob Froberger, German organist and composer (d. 1667)
1639 – Charles Weston, 3rd Earl of Portland, English soldier and noble (d. 1665)
1700 – José de Escandón, 1st Count of Sierra Gorda, Spanish sergeant and politician (d. 1770)
1724 – Augustus Hervey, 3rd Earl of Bristol, English admiral and politician, Chief Secretary for Ireland (d. 1779)
1744 – Charlotte of Mecklenburg-Strelitz, German-born Queen to George III of the United Kingdom (d. 1818)
1762 – Johann Gottlieb Fichte, German philosopher and academic (d. 1814)
1773 – Arthur Aikin, English chemist and mineralogist (d. 1854)
1795 – Johns Hopkins, American businessman and philanthropist (d. 1873)
1827 – Paul-Armand Challemel-Lacour, French academic and politician, French Minister of Foreign Affairs (d. 1896)
1832 – James Watney, Jr., English politician, brewer and cricketer (d. 1886)
1857 – John Jacob Abel, American biochemist and pharmacologist (d. 1938)
1861 – Nellie Melba, Australian soprano and actress (d. 1931)
1871 – Walter Russell, American painter, sculptor, and author (d. 1963)
1874 – Gilbert Jessop, English cricketer and soldier (d. 1955)
1878 – Alfred Laliberté, Canadian sculptor and painter (d. 1953)
1879 – Nancy Astor, Viscountess Astor, American-English politician (d. 1964)
1880 – Albert Richardson, English architect and educator, designed the Manchester Opera House (d. 1964)
1881 – Mustafa Kemal Atatürk (official birthday), Turkish field marshal and statesman, 1st President of Turkey (d. 1938)
1884 – David Munson, American runner (d. 1953)
1886 – Francis Biddle, American lawyer and judge, 58th United States Attorney General (d. 1968)
1887 – Ion Jalea, Romanian soldier and sculptor (d. 1983)
1889 – Tản Đà, Vietnamese poet and author (d. 1939)
  1889   – Henry B. Richardson, American archer (d. 1963)
1890 – Eveline Adelheid von Maydell, German-American illustrator (d. 1962)
  1890   – Ho Chi Minh, Vietnamese politician, 1st President of Vietnam (d. 1969)
1891 – Oswald Boelcke, German captain and pilot (d. 1916)
1893 – H. Bonciu, Romanian author, poet, and journalist (d. 1950)
1897 – Frank Luke, American lieutenant and pilot, Medal of Honor recipient (d. 1918)
1898 – Julius Evola, Italian philosopher and painter (d. 1974)
1899 – Lothar Rădăceanu, Romanian journalist, linguist, and politician (d. 1955)

1901–present
1902 – Lubka Kolessa, Ukrainian-Canadian pianist and educator (d. 1997)
1903 – Ruth Ella Moore, American scientist (d. 1994)
1906 – Bruce Bennett, American shot putter and actor (d. 2007)
1908 – Manik Bandopadhyay, Indian author, poet, and playwright (d. 1956)
  1908   – Merriam Modell, American author (d. 1994)
  1908   – Percy Williams, Canadian sprinter (d. 1982)
1909 – Nicholas Winton, English banker and humanitarian (d. 2015)
1910 – Alan Melville, South African cricketer (d. 1983)
1913 – Neelam Sanjiva Reddy, Indian lawyer and politician, 6th President of India (d. 1996)
1914 – Max Perutz, Austrian-English biologist and academic, Nobel Prize laureate (d. 2002)
  1914   – Alex Shibicky, Canadian ice hockey player (d. 2005)
  1914   – John Vachon, American photographer and journalist (d. 1975)
1915 – Renée Asherson, English actress (d. 2014)
1918 – Abraham Pais, Dutch-American physicist, historian, and academic (d. 2000)
1919 – Georgie Auld, Canadian-American saxophonist, clarinet player, and bandleader (d. 1990)
  1919   – Mitja Ribičič, Italian-Slovenian soldier and politician, 25th Prime Minister of Yugoslavia (d. 2013)
1920 – Tina Strobos, Dutch psychiatrist known for rescuing Jews during World War II (d. 2012)
1921 – Leslie Broderick, English lieutenant and pilot (d. 2013)
  1921   – Harry W. Brown, American colonel and pilot (d. 1991)
  1921   – Daniel Gélin, French actor, director, and screenwriter (d. 2002)
  1921   – Yuri Kochiyama, American activist (d. 2014)
  1921   – Karel van het Reve, Dutch historian and author (d. 1999)
1922 – Arthur Gorrie, Australian hobby shop proprietor (d. 1992)
1924 – Sandy Wilson, English composer and songwriter (d. 2014)
1925 – Pol Pot, Cambodian general and politician, 29th Prime Minister of Cambodia (d. 1998)
  1925   – Malcolm X, American minister and activist (d. 1965)
1926 – Edward Parkes, English engineer and academic (d. 2019)
  1926   – Peter Zadek, German director and screenwriter (d. 2009)
1927 – Serge Lang, French-American mathematician, author and academic (d. 2005)
1928 – Colin Chapman, English engineer and businessman, founded Lotus Cars (d. 1982)
  1928   – Thomas Kennedy, English air marshal (d. 2013)
  1928   – Gil McDougald, American baseball player and coach (d. 2010)
  1928   – Dolph Schayes, American basketball player and coach (d. 2015)
1929 – Helmut Braunlich, German-American violinist and composer (d. 2013)
  1929   – Richard Larter, Australian painter (d. 2014)
  1929   – John Stroger, American politician (d. 2008)
1930 – Eugene Genovese, American historian and author (d. 2012)
  1930   – Lorraine Hansberry, American playwright and director (d. 1965)
1931 – Bob Anderson, English race car driver (d. 1967)
  1931   – Trevor Peacock, English actor, screenwriter and songwriter (d. 2021)
1932 – Alma Cogan, English singer (d. 1966)
  1932   – Paul Erdman, American economist and author (d. 2007)
  1932   – Bill Fitch, American basketball player and coach (d. 2022)
  1932   – Elena Poniatowska, Mexican intellectual and journalist
1933 – Edward de Bono, Maltese physician, author, and academic (d. 2021)
1934 – Ruskin Bond, Indian author and poet
  1934   – Jim Lehrer, American journalist and author (d. 2020)
1935 – David Hartman, American journalist and television personality
1937 – Pat Roach, English wrestler (d. 2004)
1938 – Moisés da Costa Amaral, East Timorese politician (d. 1989)
  1938   – Herbie Flowers, English musician
  1938   – Igor Ter-Ovanesyan, Ukrainian long jumper and coach
1939 – Livio Berruti, Italian sprinter
  1939   – James Fox, English actor 
  1939   – Nancy Kwan, Hong Kong-American actress and makeup artist
  1939   – Jānis Lūsis, Latvian javelin thrower and coach (d. 2020)
  1939   – Dick Scobee, American pilot, and astronaut (d. 1986)
1940 – Jan Janssen, Dutch cyclist
  1940   – Mickey Newbury, American country/pop singer-songwriter (d. 2002)
1941 – Nora Ephron, American director, producer, and screenwriter (d. 2012)
  1941   – Igor Judge, Baron Judge, Maltese-English lawyer and judge, Lord Chief Justice of England and Wales
1942 – Gary Kildall, American computer scientist, founded Digital Research Inc. (d. 1994)
  1942   – Robert Kilroy-Silk, English television host and politician
1943 – Eddie May, English footballer and manager (d. 2012)
  1943   – Shirrel Rhoades, American author, publisher, and academic
1944 – Peter Mayhew, English-American actor (d. 2019)
1945 – Pete Townshend, English singer-songwriter and guitarist 
1946 – Claude Lelièvre, Belgian activist
  1946   – Michele Placido, Italian actor and director
  1946   – André the Giant, French-American wrestler and actor (d. 1993)
1947 – Paul Brady, Irish singer-songwriter, guitarist, and producer 
  1947   – Christopher Chope, English lawyer and politician
  1947   – David Helfgott, Australian pianist
1948 – Grace Jones, Jamaican-American singer-songwriter, producer, and actress
1949 – Dusty Hill, American singer-songwriter and bass player (d. 2021)  
  1949   – Philip Hunt, Baron Hunt of Kings Heath, English politician
  1949   – Archie Manning, American football player 
1950 – Tadeusz Ślusarski, Polish pole vaulter (d. 1998)
1951 – Joey Ramone, American singer-songwriter (d. 2001)
  1951   – Dick Slater, American wrestler (d. 2018)
1952 – Charlie Spedding, English runner
  1952   – Bert van Marwijk, Dutch footballer, coach, and manager
1953 – Patrick Hodge, Lord Hodge, Scottish lawyer and judge
  1953   – Shavarsh Karapetyan, Armenian finswimmer 
  1953   – Florin Marin, Romanian footballer and manager
  1953   – Victoria Wood, English actress, singer, director, and screenwriter (d. 2016)
1954 – Rick Cerone, American baseball player and sportscaster
  1954   – Lena Einhorn, Swedish director, writer and physician
  1954   – Hōchū Ōtsuka, Japanese voice actor
  1954   – Phil Rudd, Australian-New Zealand drummer 
1955 – James Gosling, Canadian-American computer scientist, created Java
1956 – Oliver Letwin, English philosopher and politician, Chancellor of the Duchy of Lancaster
  1956   – Martyn Ware, English keyboard player, songwriter, and producer 
1957 – Bill Laimbeer, American basketball player and coach
  1957   – James Reyne, Nigerian-Australian singer-songwriter 
1961 – Vadim Cojocaru, Moldovan politician (d. 2021)
  1961   – Gregory Poirier, American director, producer, and screenwriter
  1961   – Wayne Van Dorp, Canadian ice hockey player
1963 – Filippo Galli, Italian footballer and manager
1964 – Peter Jackson, Australian rugby league player and sportscaster (d. 1997)
  1964   – John Lee, South Korean-American football player
  1964   – Miloslav Mečíř, Slovak tennis player
1965 – Maile Flanagan, American actress, producer, and screenwriter
1966 – Marc Bureau, Canadian ice hockey player and sportscaster
  1966   – Jodi Picoult, American author and educator
  1966   – Polly Walker, English actress
1967 – Alexia, Italian singer
  1967   – Geraldine Somerville, Irish-born English actress
1968 – Kyle Eastwood, American actor and bass player
1970 – Stuart Cable, Welsh drummer (d. 2010)
  1970   – K. J. Choi, South Korean golfer
  1970   – Regina Narva, Estonian chess player
  1970   – Nia Zulkarnaen, Indonesian actress, singer and producer
1971 – Ross Katz, American director, producer, and screenwriter
  1971   – Andres Salumets, Estonian biologist, biochemist, and educator
1972 – Jenny Berggren, Swedish singer-songwriter 
  1972   – Claudia Karvan, Australian actress, producer, and screenwriter
1973 – Dario Franchitti, Scottish race car driver
1974 – Andrew Johns, Australian rugby league player, coach, and sportscaster
  1974   – Emma Shapplin, French soprano
  1974   – Nawazuddin Siddiqui, Indian actor
1975 – Pretinha, Brazilian footballer
  1975   – London Fletcher, American football player
  1975   – Josh Paul, American baseball player and manager
  1975   – Jonas Renkse, Swedish singer-songwriter, guitarist, and producer 
1976 – Ed Cota, American basketball player
  1976   – Kevin Garnett, American basketball player
1977 – Manuel Almunia, Spanish footballer
  1977   – Wouter Hamel, Dutch singer and guitarist
  1977   – Brandon Inge, American baseball player
  1977   – Natalia Oreiro, Uruguayan singer-songwriter and actress
1978 – Marcus Bent, English footballer
  1978   – Dave Bus, Dutch footballer
1979 – Andrea Pirlo, Italian footballer
  1979   – Diego Forlán, Uruguayan footballer
  1979   – Shooter Jennings, American country singer, songwriter
1980 – Tony Hackworth, English footballer
1981 – Luciano Figueroa, Argentinian footballer
  1981   – Yo Gotti, American rapper
  1981   – Michael Leighton, Canadian ice hockey player
  1981   – Sina Schielke, German sprinter
  1981   – Klaas-Erik Zwering, Dutch swimmer
1982 – Kevin Amankwaah, English footballer
  1982   – Pål Steffen Andresen, Norwegian footballer
  1982   – Klaas Vantornout, Belgian cyclist
1983 – Michael Che, American comedian
  1983   – Jessica Fox, English actress
1984 – Marcedes Lewis, American football player
1985 – Malakai Black, Dutch professional wrestler
1986 – Mario Chalmers, American basketball player
1987 – Michael Angelakos, American singer-songwriter and producer 
  1987   – David Edgar, Canadian soccer player
  1987   – Mariano Torres, Argentinian footballer
  1987   – Jayne Wisener, Northern Irish actress
1991 – Jordan Pruitt, American singer-songwriter
1992 – Michele Camporese, Italian footballer 
  1992   – Ola John, Dutch footballer
  1992   – Felise Kaufusi, New Zealand-Tongan rugby league player
  1992   – Evgeny Kuznetsov, Russian ice hockey player
  1992   – Marshmello, American electronic music producer and DJ
  1992   – Sam Smith, English singer-songwriter
  1992   – Heather Watson, British tennis player
1994 – Carlos Guzmán, Mexican footballer
1995 – Taane Milne, New Zealand rugby league player
2001 – Elizabeth Mandlik, American tennis player
2003 – Jojo Siwa, American dancer, singer, actress, and YouTube personality

Deaths

Pre-1600
 804 – Alcuin, English monk and scholar (b. 735)
 956 – Robert, archbishop of Trier
 988 – Dunstan, English archbishop and saint (b. 909)
1102 – Stephen, Count of Blois (b. 1045)
1125 – Vladimir II Monomakh, Grand Duke of Kyiv
1164 – Saint Bashnouna, Egyptian saint and martyr
1218 – Otto IV, Holy Roman Emperor
1296 – Pope Celestine V (b. 1215)
1303 – Saint Ivo of Kermartin, French canon lawyer (b. 1253)
1319 – Louis, Count of Évreux (b. 1276)
1389 – Dmitry Donskoy, Grand Prince of Muscovy (b. 1350)
1396 – John I of Aragon (b. 1350)
1526 – Emperor Go-Kashiwabara of Japan (b. 1464)
1531 – Jan Łaski, Polish archbishop and diplomat (b. 1456)
1536 – Anne Boleyn, Queen of England (1533–1536); second wife of Henry VIII of England

1601–1900
1601 – Costanzo Porta, Italian composer (b. 1528)
1609 – García Hurtado de Mendoza, 5th Marquis of Cañete (b. 1535)
1610 – Thomas Sanchez, Spanish priest and theologian (b. 1550)
1623 – Mariam-uz-Zamani, Empress of the Mughal Empire (b. 1542)
1637 – Isaac Beeckman, Dutch scientist and philosopher (b. 1588)
1715 – Charles Montagu, 1st Earl of Halifax, English poet and politician, Chancellor of the Exchequer (b. 1661)
1786 – John Stanley, English organist and composer (b. 1712)
1795 – Josiah Bartlett, American physician and politician, 4th Governor of New Hampshire (b. 1729)
  1795   – James Boswell, Scottish biographer (b. 1740)
1798 – William Byron, 5th Baron Byron, English lieutenant and politician (b. 1722)
1821 – Camille Jordan, French lawyer and politician (b. 1771)
1825 – Claude Henri de Rouvroy, comte de Saint-Simon, French philosopher and theorist (b. 1760)
1831 – Johann Friedrich von Eschscholtz, Estonian-German physician, botanist, and entomologist (b. 1793)
1864 – Nathaniel Hawthorne, American novelist and short story writer (b. 1804)
1865 – Sengge Rinchen, Mongolian general (b. 1811)
1872 – John Baker, English-Australian politician, 2nd Premier of South Australia (b. 1813)
1876 – Guillaume Groen van Prinsterer, Dutch historian and politician (b. 1801)
1885 – Peter W. Barlow, English engineer (b. 1809)
1895 – José Martí, Cuban journalist, poet, and philosopher (b. 1853)
1898 – William Ewart Gladstone, English lawyer and politician, Prime Minister of the United Kingdom (b. 1809)

1901–present
1901 – Marthinus Wessel Pretorius, South African general and politician, 1st President of the South African Republic (b. 1819)
1903 – Arthur Shrewsbury, English cricketer (b. 1856)
1904 – Auguste Molinier, French librarian and historian (b. 1851)
  1904   – Jamsetji Tata, Indian businessman, founded Tata Group (b. 1839)
1906 – Gabriel Dumont, Canadian Métis leader (b. 1837)
1907 – Benjamin Baker, English engineer, designed the Forth Bridge (b. 1840)
1912 – Bolesław Prus, Polish journalist and author (b. 1847)
1915 – John Simpson Kirkpatrick, English-Australian soldier (b. 1892)
1918 – Gervais Raoul Lufbery, French-American soldier and pilot (b. 1885)
1935 – T. E. Lawrence, British colonel and archaeologist (b. 1888)
1936 – Muhammad Marmaduke Pickthall, British Islamic scholar (b. 1875)
1939 – Ahmet Ağaoğlu, Azerbaijani-Turkish journalist and publicist (b. 1869)
1943 – Kristjan Raud, Estonian painter and illustrator (b. 1865)
1945 – Philipp Bouhler, German soldier and politician (b. 1889)
1946 – Booth Tarkington, American novelist and dramatist (b. 1869)
1950 – Daniel Ciugureanu, Romanian physician and politician, Prime Minister of Moldova (b. 1884)
1954 – Charles Ives, American composer and educator (b. 1874)
1958 – Jadunath Sarkar, Indian historian (b. 1870)
1958 – Archie Scott Brown, Scottish race car driver (b. 1927)
  1958   – Ronald Colman, English actor (b. 1891)
1963 – Walter Russell, American painter, sculptor, and author (b. 1871)
1962 – Gabriele Münter, German painter (d. 1877)
1969 – Coleman Hawkins, American saxophonist and clarinet player (b. 1901)
1971 – Ogden Nash, American poet (b. 1902)
1978 – Albert Kivikas, Estonian-Swedish journalist and author (b. 1898)
1980 – Joseph Schull, Canadian playwright and historian (b. 1906)
1983 – Jean Rey, Belgian lawyer and politician, 2nd President of the European Commission (b. 1902)
1984 – John Betjeman, English poet and academic (b. 1906)
1985 – Maqbular Rahman Sarkar, Bangladeshi academic (b. 1928)
1986 – Jimmy Lyons, American saxophonist (b. 1931)
1987 – James Tiptree, Jr., American psychologist and author (b. 1915)
1989 – Yiannis Papaioannou, Greek composer and educator (b. 1910)
1994 – Jacques Ellul, French sociologist, philosopher, and academic (b. 1912)
  1994   – Jacqueline Kennedy Onassis, American journalist, 37th First Lady of the United States (b. 1929)
  1994   – Luis Ocaña, Spanish cyclist (b. 1945)
1996 – John Beradino, American baseball player and actor (b. 1917)
1998 – Sōsuke Uno, Japanese soldier and politician, 75th Prime Minister of Japan (b. 1922)
2001 – Alexey Maresyev, Russian soldier and pilot (b. 1916)
  2001   – Susannah McCorkle, American singer (b. 1946)
2002 – John Gorton, Australian lieutenant and politician, 19th Prime Minister of Australia (b. 1911)
  2002   – Walter Lord, American historian and author (b. 1917)
2004 – Mary Dresselhuys, Dutch actress and screenwriter (b. 1907)
2007 – Bernard Blaut, Polish footballer and coach (b. 1940)
  2007   – Dean Eyre, New Zealand politician (b. 1914)
2008 – Vijay Tendulkar, Indian playwright and screenwriter (b. 1928)
2009 – Robert F. Furchgott, American biochemist and academic, Nobel Prize laureate (b. 1916)
  2009   – Nicholas Maw, English composer and academic (b. 1935)
2009 – Clint Smith, Canadian ice hockey player and coach (b. 1913)
2011 – Garret FitzGerald, Irish lawyer and politician, 8th Taoiseach of Ireland (b. 1926)
  2011   – Jeffrey Catherine Jones, American artist (b.1944)
2012 – Bob Boozer, American basketball player (b. 1937)
  2012   – Tamara Brooks, American conductor and educator (b. 1941)
  2012   – Ian Burgess, English race car driver (b. 1930)
  2012   – Gerhard Hetz, German-Mexican swimmer (b. 1942)
  2012   – Phil Lamason, New Zealand soldier and pilot (b. 1918)
2013 – G. Sarsfield Ford, American lawyer and jurist (b. 1933)
  2013   – Robin Harrison, English-Canadian pianist and composer (b. 1932)
  2013   – Neil Reynolds, Canadian journalist and politician (b. 1940)
2014 – Simon Andrews, English motorcycle racer (b. 1982)
  2014   – Jack Brabham, Australian race car driver (b. 1926)
  2014   – Sam Greenlee, American author and poet (b. 1930)
  2014   – Vincent Harding, American historian and scholar (b. 1931)
  2014   – Gabriel Kolko, American historian and author (b. 1932)
  2014   – Zbigniew Pietrzykowski, Polish boxer (b. 1934)
2015 – Bruce Lundvall, American businessman (b. 1935)
  2015   – Ted McWhinney, Australian-Canadian lawyer and politician (b. 1924)
  2015   – Happy Rockefeller, American philanthropist, socialite; 31st Second Lady of the United States (b. 1926)
  2015   – Robert S. Wistrich, English historian, author, and academic (b. 1945)
2016 – Alan Young, English-born Canadian-American actor (b. 1919)
  2016   – Morley Safer, Canadian-born American journalist (b. 1931)
2017 – Nawshirwan Mustafa, General coordinator of the Movement for Change (Gorran) (b. 1944)
  2017   – Stanislav Petrov, Lt. Colonel in Soviet Air Defence Forces (b. 1939)
2018 – Zhengzhang Shangfang, Chinese linguist (b. 1933)
2021 – Paul Mooney, American comedian (b. 1941)

Holidays and observances
 Christian feast day:
 Calocerus (Eastern Orthodox Church)
 Crispin of Viterbo
 Dunstan (Roman Catholic Church, Eastern Orthodox Church; commemoration, Anglicanism)
 Ivo of Kermartin
 Joaquina Vedruna de Mas
 Maria Bernarda Bütler
 Peter Celestine
 Pudentiana (Roman Catholic Church, Eastern Orthodox Church)
 May 19 (Eastern Orthodox liturgics)
 Greek Genocide Remembrance Day (Greece)
 Commemoration of Atatürk, Youth and Sports Day (Turkey, Northern Cyprus)
 Hồ Chí Minh's Birthday (Vietnam)
 Malcolm X Day (United States of America)
 National Asian & Pacific Islander HIV/AIDS Awareness Day (United States)
 Hepatitis Testing Day (United States)
 Mother's Day (Kyrgyzstan)

References

External links

 BBC: On This Day
 
 Historical Events on May 19

Days of the year
May